Roger David Casement (1 September 1864 – 3 August 1916), known as Sir Roger Casement, CMG, between 1911 and 1916, was a diplomat and Irish nationalist executed by the United Kingdom for treason during World War I. He worked for the British Foreign Office as a diplomat, becoming known as a humanitarian activist, and later as a poet and Easter Rising leader. Described as the "father of twentieth-century human rights investigations", he was honoured in 1905 for the Casement Report on the Congo and knighted in 1911 for his important investigations of human rights abuses in the rubber industry in Peru.

In Africa as a young man, Casement first worked for commercial interests before joining the British Colonial Service. In 1891 he was appointed as a British consul, a profession he followed for more than 20 years. Influenced by the Boer War and his investigation into colonial atrocities against indigenous peoples, Casement grew to mistrust imperialism. After retiring from consular service in 1913, he became more involved with Irish republicanism and other separatist movements.

During World War I, he made efforts to gain German military aid for the 1916 Easter Rising that sought to gain Irish independence. He was arrested, convicted and executed for high treason. He was stripped of his knighthood and other honours. Before the trial, the British government circulated excerpts said to be from his private journals, known as the Black Diaries, which detailed homosexual activities. Given prevailing views and existing laws on homosexuality, this material undermined support for clemency for Casement. Debates have continued about these diaries: a handwriting comparison study in 2002 concluded that Casement had written the diaries, but this was still contested by some.

Early life

Family and education
Casement was born in Dublin to an Anglo-Irish family, and lived in very early childhood at Doyle's Cottage, Lawson Terrace, Sandycove, a terrace that no longer exists, but that was on Sandycove Road between what is now Fitzgerald's pub and The Butler's Pantry delicatessen.

His father, Captain Roger Casement of the (King's Own) Regiment of Dragoons, was the son of Hugh Casement, a Belfast shipping merchant who went bankrupt and later moved to Australia. Captain Casement had served in the 1842 Afghan campaign. He travelled to Europe to fight as a volunteer in the Hungarian Revolution of 1848 but arrived after the Surrender at Világos. After the family moved to England, Roger's mother, Anne Jephson (or Jepson), of a Dublin Anglican family, purportedly had him secretly baptised at the age of three as a Roman Catholic in Rhyl, Wales. However, the priest who arranged his baptism in 1916 clearly stated that the claimed earlier baptism had been in Aberystwyth, 80 miles from Rhyl, raising the question as to why such a supposedly-important event should also become so misremembered.

According to an 1892 letter, Casement believed his mother was descended from the Jephson family of Mallow, County Cork but the Jephson family's historian provides no evidence of this. The family lived in England in genteel poverty; Roger's mother died when he was nine. His father took the family back to Ireland to County Antrim to live near paternal relatives. When Casement was 13 years old, his father died in Ballymena, and he was left dependent on the charity of relatives, the Youngs and the Casements. He was educated at the Diocesan School, Ballymena (later the Ballymena Academy). He left school at 16 and went to England to work as a clerk with Elder Dempster, a Liverpool shipping company headed by Alfred Lewis Jones.

Roger Casement's brother, Thomas Hugh Jephson Casement (1863–1939), had a roving life at sea and as a soldier, and later helped establish the Irish Coastguard Service. He was the inspiration for a character in Denis Johnston's play The Moon in the Yellow River. He drowned in Dublin's Grand Canal on 6 March 1939, having threatened suicide.

Observations of Casement
In a recollection of Casement, which conceivably is coloured by knowledge of his subsequent fate, Ernest Hambloch, Casement's deputy during his consular posting to Brazil, recalls an "unexpected" figure: tall, ungainly; "elaborately courteous" but with "a good deal of pose about him, as though he was afraid of being caught off his guard". "An easy talker and a fluent writer", he could “expound a case, but not argue it". His greatest charm, of which he seemed "quite unconscious" was his voice, which was "very musical." The eyes were "kindly", but not given to laughter: "a sense of humour might have saved him from many things".

Joseph Conrad's first impressions of Casement, from an encounter in the Congo he judged "a positive piece of good luck", was "thinks, speaks, well, most intelligent and very sympathetic". Later, after Casement's arrest and trial, Conrad had more critical thoughts: "Already in Africa, I judged he was a man, properly speaking, of no mind at all. I don't mean stupid. I mean that he was all emotion. By emotional force (Putumayo, Congo report etc) he made his way, and sheer temperament—a truly tragic figure."

British diplomat and human rights investigator

The Congo and the Casement Report

Casement worked in the Congo for Henry Morton Stanley and the African International Association from 1884; this association became known as a front for King Leopold II of Belgium in his takeover of what became the so-called Congo Free State. Casement worked on a survey to improve communication and recruited and supervised workmen in building a railroad to bypass the lower 220 miles of the Congo River, which is made unnavigable by cataracts, in order to improve transportation and trade to the Upper Congo. During his commercial work, he learned African languages.

In 1890 Casement met Joseph Conrad, who had come to the Congo to pilot a merchant ship, Le Roi des Belges ("King of the Belgians"). Both were inspired by the idea that "European colonisation would bring moral and social progress to the continent and free its inhabitants 'from slavery, paganism and other barbarities.' Each would soon learn the gravity of his error." Conrad published his short novel Heart of Darkness in 1899, exploring the colonial ills. Casement later exposed the conditions he found in the Congo during an official investigation for the British government. In these formative years, he also met Herbert Ward, and they became longtime friends. Ward left Africa in 1889, and devoted his time to becoming an artist, and his experience there strongly influenced his work.

Casement joined the Colonial Service, under the authority of the Colonial Office, first serving overseas as a clerk in British West Africa. In August 1901 he transferred to the Foreign Office service as British consul in the eastern part of the French Congo. In 1903 the Balfour Government commissioned Casement, then its consul at Boma in the Congo Free State, to investigate the human rights situation in that colony of the Belgian king, Leopold II. Setting up a private army known as the Force Publique, Leopold had squeezed revenue out of the people of the territory through a reign of terror in the harvesting and export of rubber and other resources. In trade, Belgium shipped guns and other materials to the Congo, used chiefly to suppress the local people.

Casement travelled for weeks in the upper Congo Basin to interview people throughout the region, including workers, overseers and mercenaries. He delivered a long, detailed eyewitness report to the Crown that exposed abuses: "the enslavement, mutilation, and torture of natives on the rubber plantations." It became known as the Casement Report of 1904. King Leopold had held the Congo Free State since 1885, when the Berlin Conference of European powers and the United States effectively gave him free rein in the area.

Leopold had exploited the territory's natural resources (mostly rubber) as a private entrepreneur, not as king of the Belgians. Using violence and murder against men and their families, Leopold's private Force Publique had decimated many native villages in the course of forcing the men to gather rubber and abusing them to increase productivity. Casement's report provoked controversy, and some companies with a business interest in the Congo rejected its findings, as did Casement's former boss, Alfred Lewis Jones.

When the report was made public, opponents of Congolese conditions formed interest groups, such as the Congo Reform Association, founded by E. D. Morel with Casement's support, and demanded action to relieve the situation of the Congolese. Other European nations followed suit, as did the United States. The British Parliament demanded a meeting of the 14 signatory powers to review the 1885 Berlin Agreement defining interests in Africa. The Belgian Parliament, pushed by Socialist leader Emile Vandervelde and other critics of the king's Congolese policy, forced Léopold to set up an independent commission of inquiry. In 1905, despite Léopold's efforts, it confirmed the essentials of Casement's report. On 15 November 1908, the parliament of Belgium took over the Congo Free State from Léopold and organised its administration as the Belgian Congo.

Peru: Abuses against the Putumayo Indians

In 1906 the Foreign Office sent Casement to Brazil: first as consul in Santos, then transferred to Pará, and lastly promoted to consul-general in Rio de Janeiro. He was attached as a consular representative to a commission investigating rubber slavery by the Peruvian Amazon Company (PAC), which had been registered in Britain in 1908 and had a British board of directors and numerous stockholders. In September 1909, a journalist named Sidney Paternoster wrote in Truth, a British magazine, of abuses against PAC workers and competing Colombians in the disputed region of the Peruvian Amazon.

In addition, the British consul at Iquitos had said that Barbadians, considered British subjects as part of the empire, had been ill-treated while working for PAC, which gave the government a reason to intervene. Ordinarily it could not investigate the internal affairs of another country. American civil engineer Walter Hardenburg had told Paternoster of witnessing a joint PAC and Peruvian military action against a Colombian rubber station, which they destroyed, stealing the rubber. He also saw Peruvian Indians whose backs were marked by severe whipping, in a pattern called the Mark of Arana (the head of the rubber company), and reported other abuses.

PAC, with its operational headquarters in Iquitos, dominated the city and the region. The area was separated from the main population of Peru by the Andes, and it was 1900 miles from the Amazon's mouth at Pará. The British-registered company was effectively controlled by the archetypal rubber baron Julio César Arana and his brother. Born in Lima, Arana had climbed out of poverty to own and operate a company harvesting great quantities of rubber in the Peruvian Amazon, which was much in demand on the world market. The rubber boom had led to expansion in Iquitos as a trading center, as all the company rubber was shipped down the Amazon River from there to the Atlantic port. Numerous foreigners had flocked to the area seeking their fortunes in the rubber boom, or at least some piece of the business. The rough frontier city, both respectable businesses and the vice district, was highly dependent on the PAC.

Casement traveled to the Putumayo District, where the rubber was harvested deep in the Amazon Basin, and explored the treatment of the local Indians of Peru. The isolated area was outside the reach of the national government and near the border with Colombia, which periodically made incursions in competition for the rubber. For years, the Indians had been forced into unpaid labor by field staff of the PAC, who exerted absolute power over them and subjected them to near starvation, severe physical abuse, rape of women and girls by the managers and overseers, branding and casual murder. Casement found conditions as inhumane as those in the Congo. He interviewed both the Putumayo and men who had abused them, including three Barbadians who had also suffered from conditions of the company. When the report was publicised, there was public outrage in Britain over the abuses. Casement made two lengthy visits to the region, first in 1910 with a commission of investigators.

Casement's report has been described as a "brilliant piece of journalism", as he wove together first-person accounts by both "victims and perpetrators of atrocities ... Never before had distant colonial subjects been given such personal voices in an official document." After his report was made to the British government, some wealthy board members of the PAC were horrified by what they learned. Arana and the Peruvian government promised to make changes. In 1911, the British government asked Casement to return to Iquitos and Putumayo to see if promised changes in treatment had occurred. In a report to the British foreign secretary, dated 17 March 1911, Casement detailed the rubber company's continued use of pillories to punish the Indians:Men, women, and children were confined in them for days, weeks, and often months. ... Whole families ... were imprisonedfathers, mothers, and children, and many cases were reported of parents dying thus, either from starvation or from wounds caused by flogging, while their offspring were attached alongside of them to watch in misery themselves the dying agonies of their parents.

After his return to Britain, Casement repeated his extra-consular campaigning work by organising interventions by the Anti-Slavery and Aborigines' Protection Society and Catholic missions in the region. Some of the company men exposed as killers in his 1910 report were charged by Peru, while most fled the region and were never captured. Some entrepreneurs had smuggled out cuttings from rubber plants and began cultivation in southeast Asia in colonies of the British Empire. The scandal of the PAC caused major losses in business to the company, and rubber demand began to be met by farmed rubber in other parts of the world. With the collapse of business for PAC, most foreigners left Iquitos and it quickly returned to its former status as an isolated backwater. For a period, the Putumayo Indians were largely left alone. Arana was never prosecuted as head of the company. He lived in London for years, then returned to Peru. Despite the scandal associated with Casement's report and international pressure on the Peruvian government to change conditions, Arana later had a successful political career. He was elected a senator and died in Lima, Peru in 1952, aged 88.

Casement wrote extensively for his private record (as always) in those two years. During this period he continued to write in his diaries, and the one for 1911 was described as being unusually discursive. He kept them in London along with the 1903 diary and other papers of the period, presumably so they could be consulted in his continuing work as "Congo Casement" and as the saviour of the Putumayo Indians. In 1911 Casement received a knighthood for his efforts on behalf of the Amazonian Indians, having been appointed Companion of the Order of St Michael and St George (CMG) in 1905 for his Congo work.

Irish revolutionary

Return to Ireland 
In Ireland in 1904, on leave from Africa from that year until 1905, Casement joined the Gaelic League, an organisation established in 1893 to preserve and revive the spoken and literary use of the Irish language. He met the leaders of the powerful Irish Parliamentary Party (IPP) to lobby for his work in the Congo. He did not support those, like the IPP, who proposed Home Rule, as he believed that the House of Lords would veto such efforts. Casement was more impressed by Arthur Griffith's new Sinn Féin party (founded 1905), which called for an independent Ireland (through a non-violent series of strikes and boycotts). Its sole imperial tie would be a dual monarchy between Britain and Ireland, modeled on the policy example of Ferenc Deák in Hungary. Casement joined the party in 1905. 

In a letter to Mrs. J. R. Green, dated 20th April 1906 reflected on his conversion to the national cause as someone had "accepted imperialism" and had been close to an "ideal" Englishman. It is a mistake for an Irishman to mix himself up with the English. He is bound to do one of two things—either to go to the wall if he remains Irish or to become an Englishman himself. You see I very nearly did become one once. At the Boer War time, I had been away from Ireland for years, out of touch with everything native to my heart and mind, trying hard to do my duty, and every fresh act of duty made me appreciably nearer the ideal of the Englishman. I had accepted Imperialism. British rule was to be accepted at all costs, because it was the best for everyone under the sun, and those who opposed that extension ought rightly to be 'smashed.' I was on the high road to being a regular Imperialist jingo—although at heart underneath all, and unsuspected almost by myself, I had remained an Irishman. Well, the war, [i.e., the Boer War] gave me qualms at the end—the concentration camps bigger ones—and finally, when up in those lonely Congo forests where I found Leopold I found also myself, the incorrigible Irishman.

Ulster 
In the north, through his sister, Nina, in Portrush, and his close friends in London, Robert Lynd and Sylvia Dryhurst, Casement was drawn into the orbit of Francis Joseph Bigger. A wealthy Presbyterian solicitor, at his house on the northern shore of Belfast Lough, Ard Righ, Bigger hosted not only the poets and writers of the "Northern Revival", but also, and critically for Casement, Ulster Protestants committed to taking the case for an Irish Ireland to their co-religionists. These included Ada McNeil, with whom Casement helped organise the first Feis na nGleann (Festival of the Glens) at Waterfoot (Co. Antrim) in 1904, Bulmer Hobson (later of the IRB), the Nationalist MP Stephen Gwynn, and the Gaelic League activist Alice Milligan.

Casement retired from the British consular service in the summer of 1913. In October he spoke at a Protestant assembly at Ballymoney Town Hall organised by Captain Jack White (who, in the midst of the great Dublin lock-out, with James Connolly had begun organising a workers' militia, the Irish Citizen Army). On a platform with Ada McNeill, the historian Alice Stopford Green, and the veteran tenant-right activist J. B. Armour, he spoke to the motion disputing the claim of Edward Carson and his unionists "to represent the Protestant community of North East Ulster", and condemning the prospect of "lawless resistance" to Home Rule. 

Enthused by the meeting, which had been covered by all the London and Irish papers, Casement resolved to replicate the Ballymoney meeting across Ulster, starting with Coleraine. But the Unionist controlled council refused to allow the group access to the local Town Hall, and nothing came of it. Meanwhile an anti-Home Rule meeting addressed by Carson's lieutenant Sir James Craig, then organising the Ulster Volunteers, not only filled the Ballymoney Town Hall but had the crowd spilling out into the surrounding streets. In the event, the Ballymoney Protestant "Protest Against the Lawles Policy of Carsonism" proved to be the only meeting of its kind held anywhere in Ulster.

Already in November 1913, Casement had begun focussing on responding to "Carsonism" in kind: he became a Gaelic League member of the Provisional Committee of the Irish Volunteers launched at a meeting in the Rotunda in Dublin. At the same time White and Connolly at the ITGWU formed the Irish Citizen Army. In April 1914, he had been together with Alice Milligan in Larne shortly after Craig had had German guns run through the port, a feat Casement told her nationalists would have to match.

America and Germany 
In July 1914, Casement journeyed to the United States to promote and raise money for the Volunteers among the large and numerous Irish community there. Through his friendship with men such as Bulmer Hobson, a member both of the Volunteers and of the secret Irish Republican Brotherhood (IRB), Casement established connections with exiled Irish nationalists, particularly Clan na Gael.

Elements of the suspicious Clan did not trust Casement completely, as he was not a member of the IRB and held views they considered too moderate but others, such as John Quinn, regarded him as extreme. Devoy, initially hostile to Casement for his part in conceding control of the Irish Volunteers to John Redmond, was won over in June, and Joseph McGarrity, another Clan leader, became devoted to Casement and remained so from then on. The Howth gun-running in late July 1914, which Casement had helped to organise and (with a loan from Alice Stopford Green) finance, further enhanced his reputation.

In August 1914, at the outbreak of World War I, Casement and John Devoy arranged a meeting in New York with the western hemisphere's top-ranking German diplomat, Count Bernstorff, to propose a mutually beneficial plan: if Germany would sell guns to the Irish revolutionaries and provide military leaders, the Irish would revolt against England, diverting troops and attention from the war with Germany. Bernstorff appeared sympathetic. Casement and Devoy sent an envoy, Clan na Gael president John Kenny, to present their plan personally. Kenny, while unable to meet the German Emperor, did receive a warm reception from the German ambassador to Italy Hans von Flotow, and from Prince von Bülow.

In October 1914, Casement sailed for Germany via Norway, traveling in disguise and seeing himself as an ambassador of the Irish nation. While the journey was his idea, Clan na Gael financed the expedition. During their stop in Christiania, his companion Adler Christensen was taken to the British legation, where a reward was allegedly offered if Casement were "knocked on the head". British diplomat Mansfeldt Findlay, in contrast, advised London that Christensen had "implied that their relations were of an unnatural nature and that consequently he had great power over this man". Findlay provided no evidence to support this insinuation.

Findlay's handwritten letter of 1914 is kept in University College, Dublin, and is viewable online. This letter—written on official notepaper by Minister Findlay at the British Legation in Oslo—offers to Christensen the sum of £5,000 plus immunity from prosecution and free passage to the United States in return for information leading to the capture of Roger Casement. That amount would be approximately £2,616,000 in 2014.

In November 1914, Casement negotiated a declaration by Germany which stated:The Imperial Government formally declares that under no circumstances would Germany invade Ireland with a view to its conquest or the overthrow of any native institutions in that country. Should the fortune of this Great War, that was not of Germany's seeking, ever bring in its course German troops to the shores of Ireland, they would land there not as an army of invaders to pillage and destroy but as the forces of a Government that is inspired by goodwill towards a country and people for whom Germany desires only national prosperity and national freedom.

Casement spent most of his time in Germany seeking to recruit an Irish Brigade from among more than 2,000 Irish prisoners-of-war taken in the early months of the war and held in the prison camp of Limburg an der Lahn. His plan was that they would be trained to fight against Britain in the cause of Irish independence. American Ambassador to Germany James W. Gerard mentioned the effort in his memoir "Four Years in Germany": The Germans collected all the soldier prisoners of Irish nationality in one camp at Limburg not far from Frankfurt a. M. There efforts were made to induce them to join the German army. The men were well treated and were often visited by Sir Roger Casement who, working with the German authorities, tried to get these Irishmen to desert their flag and join the Germans. A few weaklings were persuaded by Sir Roger who finally discontinued his visits, after obtaining about thirty recruits, because the remaining Irishmen chased him out of the camp.

On 27 December 1914 Casement signed an agreement in Berlin to this effect with Arthur Zimmermann in the German Foreign Office, renouncing all his titles in a letter to British Foreign Secretary dated 1 February 1915. Fifty-two of the 2000 prisoners volunteered for the Brigade. Contrary to German promises, they received no training in the use of machine guns, which at the time were relatively new and unfamiliar weapons.

During World War I, Casement is known to have been involved in the German-backed plan by Indians to win their freedom from the British Raj, the "Hindu–German Conspiracy", recommending Joseph McGarrity to Franz von Papen as an intermediary. The Indian nationalists may also have followed Casement's strategy of trying to recruit prisoners of war to fight for Indian independence.

Both efforts proved unsuccessful. In addition to finding it difficult to ally with the Germans while held as prisoners, potential recruits to Casement's brigade knew they would be liable to the death penalty as traitors if Britain won the war. In April 1916, Germany offered the Irish 20,000 Mosin–Nagant 1891 rifles, ten machine guns and accompanying ammunition, but no German officers; it was a fraction of the quantity of the arms Casement had hoped for, with no military expertise on offer.

Casement did not learn about the Easter Rising until after the plan was fully developed. The German weapons never landed in Ireland; the Royal Navy intercepted the ship transporting them, a German cargo vessel named the Libau, disguised as a Norwegian vessel, Aud-Norge. All the crew were German sailors, but their clothes and effects, even the charts and books on the bridge, were Norwegian. As John Devoy had either misunderstood or disobeyed Pearse's instructions that the arms were under no circumstances to land before Easter Sunday, the Irish Transport and General Workers' Union (TGWU) members set to unload the arms under the command of Irish Citizen Army officer and trade unionist William Partridge were not ready. The IRB men sent to meet the boat drove off a pier and drowned.

The British had intercepted German communications coming from Washington and suspected that there was going to be an attempt to land arms at Ireland, although they were not aware of the precise location. The arms ship, under Captain Karl Spindler, was apprehended by HMS Bluebell on the late afternoon of Good Friday. About to be escorted into Queenstown (present-day Cobh), County Cork on the morning of Saturday 22 April, Captain Spindler scuttled the ship by pre-set explosive charges. Its surviving crew became prisoners of war.

Landing and capture

Casement confided his personal papers to Dr Charles Curry, with whom he had stayed at Riederau on the Ammersee, before he left Germany. According to Monteith, Casement believed the Germans were toying with him from the start and providing inadequate aid that would doom a rising to failure. He wanted to reach Ireland before the shipment of arms and to convince Eoin MacNeill (who he believed was still in control) to cancel the rising.

Casement sent John McGoey, a recently arrived Irish-American, through Denmark to Dublin, ostensibly to advise what military aid was coming from Germany and when, but with Casement's orders "to get the Heads in Ireland to call off the rising and merely try to land the arms and distribute them". McGoey did not reach Dublin, nor did his message. His fate was unknown until recently. Evidently abandoning the Irish Nationalist cause, he joined the Royal Navy in 1916, survived the war, and later returned to the United States, where he died in an accident on a building site in 1925.

In the early hours of 21 April 1916, three days before the rising began, the German submarine put Casement ashore at Banna Strand in Tralee Bay, County Kerry – the boat used is now in the Imperial War Museum in London. Suffering from a recurrence of the malaria that had plagued him since his days in the Congo, and too weak to travel, he was discovered by a sergeant of the Royal Irish Constabulary at McKenna's Fort, an ancient ring fort in Rahoneen, Ardfert now renamed Casement's Fort. They arrested Casement on charges of high treason, sabotage and espionage against the Crown. He sent word to Dublin about the inadequate German assistance. The Kerry Brigade of the Irish Volunteers might have tried to rescue him over the next three days, but its leadership in Dublin held that not a shot was to be fired in Ireland before the Easter Rising was in train and therefore ordered the Brigade to "do nothing" – a subsequent internal inquiry attached "no blame whatsoever" to the local Volunteers for failing to attempt a rescue. "He was taken to Brixton Prison to be placed under special observation for fear of an attempt of suicide. There was no staff at the Tower [of London] to guard suicidal cases."

Trial and execution
Casement's trial at bar opened at the Royal Courts of Justice on 26 June 1916 before the Lord Chief Justice (Viscount Reading), Mr Justice Avory, and Mr Justice Horridge. The prosecution had trouble arguing its case. Casement's crimes had been carried out in Germany and the Treason Act 1351 seemed to apply only to activities carried out on English (or arguably British) soil. A close reading of the Act allowed for a broader interpretation: the court decided that a comma should be read in the unpunctuated original Norman-French text, crucially altering the sense so that "in the realm or elsewhere" referred to where acts were done and not just to where the "King's enemies" might be. Afterwards, Casement himself wrote that he was to be "hanged on a comma", leading to the well-used epigram.

During his trial, the prosecution (F. E. Smith), who had admired some of Casement's work before he went over to the Germans, informally suggested to the defence barrister (A. M. Sullivan) that they should jointly produce what are now called the "Black Diaries" in evidence, as this would most likely cause the court to find Casement "guilty but insane" and save his life. Casement refused to agree to this and was subsequently found guilty and sentenced to be hanged. Before and during the trial and appeal, the British government secretly circulated some excerpts from Casement's journals, exposing Casement as a "sexual deviant". These included numerous explicit accounts of sexual activity. This aroused public opinion against him and influenced those notables who might otherwise have tried to intervene. Given societal norms and the illegality of homosexuality at the time, support for Casement's reprieve declined in some quarters. The journals became known in the 1950s as the Black Diaries and are still in the National Archives, whilst most of the other exhibits from the trial are in the Crime Museum in London.

Casement unsuccessfully appealed against his conviction and death sentence. Those who pleaded for clemency for Casement included Sir Arthur Conan Doyle, who was acquainted with Casement through the work of the Congo Reform Association, poet W. B. Yeats, and playwright George Bernard Shaw. Joseph Conrad could not forgive Casement, nor could Casement's longtime friend, the sculptor Herbert Ward, whose son Charles had been killed on the Western Front that January, and who would change the name of Casement's godson, who had been named after him. Members of the Casement family in Antrim contributed discreetly to the defence fund, although they had sons in the British Army and Navy. A United States Senate appeal against the death sentence was rejected by the British cabinet on the insistence of prosecutor F. E. Smith, an opponent of Irish independence.

Casement's knighthood was forfeited on 29 June 1916. On the day of his execution by hanging at Pentonville Prison, 3 August 1916, Casement was received into the Catholic Church at his request. He was attended by two Catholic priests, Dean Timothy Ring and Father James Carey, from the East London parish of SS Mary and Michael. The latter, also known as James McCarroll, said of Casement that he was "a saint ... we should be praying to him [Casement] instead of for him". At the time of his death he was 51 years old.

State funeral
Casement's body was buried in quicklime in the prison cemetery at the rear of Pentonville Prison, where he had been hanged, though his last wish was to be buried at Murlough Bay on the north coast of County Antrim, in present-day Northern Ireland. During the decades after his execution, successive British governments refused many formal requests for repatriation of Casement's remains. For example, in September 1953 Taoiseach Éamon de Valera, on a visit to Prime Minister Winston Churchill in Downing Street, requested the return of the remains. Churchill said he was not personally opposed to the idea but would consult with his colleagues and take legal advice. He ultimately turned down the Irish request, citing "specific and binding" legal obligations that the remains of executed prisoners could not be exhumed. De Valera disputed the legal advice and responded:

De Valera received no reply.

Finally, in 1965 Casement's remains were repatriated to Ireland. Despite the annulment, or withdrawal, of his knighthood in 1916, the 1965 UK Cabinet record of the repatriation decision refers to him as "Sir Roger Casement". Contrary to Casement's wishes, Prime Minister Harold Wilson's government had released the remains only on condition that they could not be brought into Northern Ireland, as "the government feared that a reburial there could provoke Catholic celebrations and Protestant reactions."

Casement's remains lay in state at the Garrison Church, Arbour Hill (now Arbour Hill Prison) in Dublin city for five days, close to the graves of other leaders of the 1916 Easter Rising, but would not be buried beside them. After a state funeral, the remains were buried with full military honours in the Republican plot in Glasnevin Cemetery in Dublin,
alongside other Irish republicans and nationalists. The President of Ireland, Éamon de Valera, then (in his mid-eighties) the last surviving leader of the Easter Rising, attended the ceremony, along with an estimated 30,000 others.

The Black Diaries

British officials have claimed that Casement kept the Black Diaries, a set of diaries covering the years 1903, 1910 and 1911 (twice). Jeffrey Dudgeon, who published an edition of all the diaries said, "His homosexual life was almost entirely out of sight and disconnected from his career and political work". If genuine, the diaries reveal Casement was a homosexual who had many partners, had a fondness for young men and mostly paid for sex.

In 1916 after Casement's conviction for high treason, the British government circulated alleged photographs of pages of the diary to individuals campaigning for the commutation of Casement's death sentence. At a time of strong conservatism, not least among Irish Catholics, publicising the Black Diaries and Casement's alleged homosexuality undermined support for him. The question of whether the diaries are genuine or forgeries has been much debated. The diaries were declassified for limited inspection (by persons approved by the Home Office) in August 1959. The original diaries may be seen at the British National Archives in Kew. Historians and biographers of Casement's life have taken opposing views. Roger McHugh (in 1976) and Angus Mitchell (in 2000 and later) regard the diaries as forged. In 2012, Mitchell published several articles in the Field Day Review of the University of Notre Dame.

The Giles Report
In 2005 the Royal Irish Academy, Dublin published The Giles Report, a private report on the Black Diaries written in 2002. Two US forensic-document examiners reviewed the Giles Report; both were critical of it. James Horan stated, "As editor of the Journal of Forensic Sciences and The Journal of the American Society of Questioned Document Examiners, I would not recommend publication of the Giles Report because the report does not show how its conclusion was reached. To the question, 'Is the writing Roger Casement's?' on the basis of the Giles Report as it stands, my answer would have to be I cannot tell."

Marcel Matley, a second document examiner, stated, "Even if every document examined were the authentic writing of Casement, this report does nothing to establish the fact." A very brief expert opinion in 1959 by a Home Office employee failed to identify Casement as author of the diaries. This opinion is almost unknown and does not appear in the Casement literature. As late as July 2015 the UK National Archives ambiguously described the Black Diaries as "attributed to Roger Casement", while at the same time unambiguously declaring their satisfaction with the result of the private Giles Report.

Llosa and Dudgeon
Mario Vargas Llosa presented a mixed account of Casement's sexuality in his 2010 novel, The Dream of the Celt, suggesting that Casement wrote partially fictional diaries of what he wished had taken place in homosexual encounters. Dudgeon suggested in a 2013 article that Casement needed to be "sexless" to fit his role as a Catholic martyr in the nationalist movement of the time.<ref name="dudgeon">{{cite web|last= Dudgeon|first= Jeffrey|url= http://www.fupress.com/bsfm-sijis|title= Cult of the Sexless Casement with Special Reference to the Novel The Dream of the Celt by Mario Vargas Llosa, Studi irlandesi. A Journal of Irish Studies no. 3 (2013), pp. 35–58.}}</ref> Dudgeon writes, "The evidence that Casement was a busy homosexual is in his own words and handwriting in the diaries, and is colossally convincing because of its detail and extent."Mitchell's argument that has persistently argued that the question of Casement's sexuality has nothing to do with whether or not the diaries are forged has largely debunked Dudgeon's argument. See "The Black Stain", Gay Community News, April 2016. Available here 

Legacy
Landmarks, buildings and organisations

 Casement Park, the Gaelic Athletic Association ground on Andersonstown Road in west Belfast.
 Several Gaelic Athletic Association clubs, for instance Roger Casements GAA Club (Coventry, England), Brampton Roger Casements GAC (Toronto, Canada) and Roger Casements GAC (Portglenone, Northern Ireland)
 Gaelscoil Mhic Easmainn (Irish for Casement) is an Irish speaking national school in Tralee, County Kerry
 In Dundalk there is an estate named after him in Árd Easmuinn, Casement Heights.
 Casement Aerodrome in Baldonnel, the Irish Air Corps base near Dublin.
 Casement Rail and Bus Station in Tralee, near the site of Casement's landing on Banna Strand. Operated by Iarnród Éireann and Córas Iompair Éireann
 In Cork, an estate is named Roger Casement Park after him in Glasheen, a western suburb of the city. 
 In Clonakilty, Co.Cork, a street and adjacent estate is named in his honour.
 A monument at Banna Strand in Kerry is open to the public at all times.
 A statue of him is erected in Ballyheigue, Co.Kerry
 A statue of him stands in Dún Laoghaire harbour.
 Many streets are named for him, including Casement Road, Park, Drive and Grove in Finglas, County Dublin. 
 In Harryville, Ballymena, County Antrim, there is a Casement Street, named for his great-grandfather, who was a solicitor there.

Representation in culture
Casement has been the subject of ballads, poetry, novels, and TV series since his death, including:
 The ballad "Lonely Banna Strand" telling the story of Casement's role in the prelude to the Easter Rising, his arrest, and his execution.
 Arthur Conan Doyle used Casement as an inspiration for the character of Lord John Roxton in the 1912 novel, The Lost World.
 W. B. Yeats wrote a poem,The Ghost of Roger Casement, demanding the return of Casement's remains, with the refrain, "The ghost of Roger Casement/Is beating on the door"
 Roger Casement is featured in Giant's Causeway (1922) by Pierre Benoit, who portrays him as a noble martyr.
 Agatha Christie refers to Casement and the 1916 Uprising in her 1941 novel N or M? Brendan Behan, in his autobiographical novel Borstal Boy (1958), speaks of the respect his family had for Casement.
 Casement is the subject of the play Prisoner of the Crown, which was written by Richard Herd and Richard Stockton; it premiered at the Abbey Theatre in Dublin on 15 February 1972
 A German TV series, Sir Roger Casement (1968), was made about his time in Germany during World War I. 
 In 1973 BBC Radio aired a critically acclaimed radio play by David Rudkin entitled Cries from Casement as His Bones are Brought to Dublin The Dream of the Celt by Mario Vargas Llosa (winner of the Nobel Prize for literature) is an historical novel based on Roger Casement's life, translated from the Spanish by Edith Grossman and published in 2012.
 American Noise Rock band ...And You Will Know Us by the Trail of Dead released an instrumental entitled "The Betrayal of Roger Casement & the Irish Brigade" on their 2008 Festival Thyme EP
 Dying for Ireland (2012) is a biographical novel by Alan Lewis, which presents a "fictional reimagining" of Casement's prison memoirs, based on his writings, histories and biographies.
 A one-act play, Shall Roger Casement Hang?, based mainly on his interrogation at Scotland Yard, was performed for the first time at the Tron Theatre in Glasgow in May 2016.
 The Trial of Roger Casement is a graphic novel by Fionnuala Doran
 Roger Casement is discussed in W. G. Sebald's novel The Rings of Saturn.
 Valiant Gentlemen is an historical novel based on Casement's friendship with Herbert Ward and his wife Sarita Sanford, by Sabina Murray, Grove/Atlantic, 2016.
 Roger Casement – Heart of Darkness (1992) is a documentary by Kenneth Griffith on the life of Roger Casement.Vahimagi, Tise. (2014). Griffith, Kenneth (1921–2006) . British Film Institute. Screenonline The name refers to Joseph Conrad's novel of that name, written after Conrad met Casement in Congo.
 The Ghost of Roger Casement (2002) is a documentary that investigates the authenticity of the forensic examination of the Black Diaries.

Notes

References

Bibliography
By Roger Casement:
 1910. Roger Casement's Diaries: 1910. The Black and the White. Sawyer, Roger, ed. London: Pimlico. 
 1910. The Amazon Journal of Roger Casement. Mitchell, Angus, ed. Anaconda Editions.
 1911. 'Sir Roger Casement's Heart of Darkness: The 1911 Documents' Mitchell, Angus, ed., Irish Manuscripts Commission.
 1914. The Crime against Ireland, and How the War May Right it. Berlin: no publisher.
 1914. Ireland, Germany and Freedom of the Seas: A Possible Outcome of the War of 1914. New York & Philadelphia: The Irish Press Bureau. Reprinted 2005: 
 1914–16 'One Bold Deed of Open Treason: The Berlin Diary of Roger Casement', Mitchell, Angus ed., Merrion
 1915. The Crime against Europe. The Causes of the War and the Foundations of Peace. Berlin: The Continental Times.
 1916. Gesammelte Schriften. Irland, Deutschland und die Freiheit der Meere und andere Aufsätze. Diessen vor München: Joseph Huber Verlag. Second expanded edition, 1917.
 1918. Some Poems. London: The Talbot Press/T. Fisher Unwin.Secondary Literature, and other materials cited in this entry:

 Daly, Mary E., ed. 2005. Roger Casement in Irish and World History, Dublin, Royal Irish Academy
 Doerries, Reinhard R., 2000. Prelude to the Easter Rising: Sir Roger Casement in Imperial Germany. London & Portland. Frank Cass.
 Dudgeon, Jeffrey, 2002. Roger Casement: The Black Diaries with a Study of his Background, Sexuality and Irish Political Life. Belfast Press (includes first publication of 1911 diary); 2nd paperback and Kindle editions, 2016; 3rd paperback and Kindle editions, 2019, .
 Dudgeon, Jeffrey, July 2016. Roger Casement's German Diary 1914–1916 including 'A Last Page' and associated correspondence. Belfast Press, .
 Goodman, Jordan, The Devil and Mr. Casement: One Man's Battle for Human Rights in South America's Heart of Darkness, 2010. Farrar, Straus & Giroux; 
 Harris, Brian, "Injustice", Sutton Publishing. 2006;  
 Hochschild, Adam, King Leopold's Ghost.
 Hyde, H. Montgomery, 1960. Trial of Roger Casement. London: William Hodge. Penguin edition 1964.
 Hyde, H. Montgomery, 1970. The Love That Dared not Speak its Name. Boston: Little, Brown (in UK The Other Love).
 Inglis, Brian, 1973. Roger Casement, London: Hodder and Stoughton. Republished 1993 by Blackstaff Belfast and by Penguin 2002; .
 Lacey, Brian, 2008. Terrible Queer Creatures: Homosexuality in Irish History. Dublin: Wordwell Books.
 MacColl, René, 1956. Roger Casement. London, Hamish Hamilton.
 Mc Cormack, W. J., 2002. Roger Casement in Death or Haunting the Free State. Dublin: UCD Press.
 Minta, Stephen, 1993. Aguirre: The Re-creation of a Sixteenth-Century Journey Across South America. Henry Holt & Co. .
 Mitchell, Angus, 2003. Casement (Life & Times Series). Haus Publishing Limited; .
 Mitchell, Angus, 2013. Roger Casement. Dublin: O'Brien Press; .
 Ó Síocháin, Séamas and Michael O’Sullivan, eds., 2004. The Eyes of Another Race: Roger Casement's Congo Report and 1903 Diary. University College Dublin Press; .
 Ó Síocháin, Séamas, 2008. Roger Casement: Imperialist, Rebel, Revolutionary. Dublin: Lilliput Press.
 Reid, B.L., 1987. The Lives of Roger Casement. London: The Yale Press; .
 Sawyer, Roger, 1984. Casement: The Flawed Hero. London: Routledge & Kegan Paul.
 Singleton-Gates, Peter, & Maurice Girodias, 1959. The Black Diaries. An Account of Roger Casement's Life and Times with a Collection of His Diaries and Public Writings. Paris: The Olympia Press. First edition of the Black Diaries.
 Thomson, Basil, 1922. Queer People (chapters 7–8), an account of the Easter Uprising and Casement's involvement from the head of Scotland Yard at the time. London: Hodder and Stoughton.
 Clayton, Xander: Aud, Plymouth 2007.
 Wolf, Karin, 1972. Sir Roger Casement und die deutsch-irischen Beziehungen''. Berlin: Duncker & Humblot; .
 Eberspächer, Cord/Wiechmann, Gerhard. "Erfolg Revolution kann Krieg entscheiden". Der Einsatz von S.M.H. Libau im irischen Osteraufstand 1916 ("Success revolution may decide war". The use of S.M.H. Libau in the Easter Rising 1916), in: Schiff & Zeit, Nr. 67, Frühjahr 2008, S 2–16.

External links

 "Ireland, Germany and Europe", From the Digital Library@Villanova University.
 Séamas Ó’Síocháin: Casement, Roger, Sir, in: 1914–1918-online. International Encyclopedia of the First World War.
 Roger Casement's speech from the Dock at the end of his trial for treason.
 Report of the British Consul, Roger Casement, on the Administration of the Congo Free State, John Jay School of Law, CUNY
 Condolences and Funerals  2005 online exhibition by the National Archives of Ireland; covers Casement's 1965 reburial
 Irish Military Archives : DOD/3/47020 : Funeral/burial Roger Casement and others  digitised file of preparations for the state funeral
 
 
 
 Boehm/Casement Papers. A UCD Digital Library Collection.
 
 Archive Roger Casement, Royal museum for central Africa

1864 births
1916 deaths
20th-century executions by England and Wales
20th-century executions for treason
19th-century Anglo-Irish people
20th-century Anglo-Irish people
20th-century Roman Catholics
People from Sandycove
British diplomats
Burials at Glasnevin Cemetery
Congo Free State
Converts to Roman Catholicism from Anglicanism
Executed participants in the Easter Rising
Indigenous rights activists
Irish humanitarians
Irish nationalists
Irish republicans
Irish LGBT poets
LGBT Roman Catholics
People educated at Ballymena Academy
People stripped of a British Commonwealth honour
Politicians from Dublin (city)
Prisoners in the Tower of London